Anaerotruncus colihominis  is a Gram-positive, non-spore-forming, rod-shaped and anaerobic bacterium from the genus Anaerotruncus which occur in human faeces.

References

External links
Type strain of Anaerotruncus colihominis at BacDive -  the Bacterial Diversity Metadatabase	

Clostridiaceae
Bacteria described in 2004